Anomalomyia is a genus of fly belonging to the family Mycetophilidae.

Species
Anomalomyia affinis Tonnoir & Edwards, 1927
Anomalomyia basalis Tonnoir & Edwards, 1927
Anomalomyia flavicauda Tonnoir & Edwards, 1927
Anomalomyia guttata (Hutton, 1881)
Anomalomyia immaculata Tonnoir & Edwards, 1927
Anomalomyia intermedia Matile, 1993
Anomalomyia minor (Marshall, 1896)
Anomalomyia nasuta Matile, 1993
Anomalomyia obscura Tonnoir & Edwards, 1927
Anomalomyia picta Matile, 1993
Anomalomyia subobscura Tonnoir & Edwards, 1927
Anomalomyia thompsoni Tonnoir & Edwards, 1927
Anomalomyia viatoris Tonnoir & Edwards, 1927

References

Mycetophilidae
Sciaroidea genera
Diptera of Australasia
Taxa named by Frederick Hutton (scientist)